Deutzia crenata is a species of flowering shrub in the hydrangea family (Hydrangeaceae). It is native to Japan, where it is common and found throughout the country. Its natural habitat is in forest edges and cliffs. It has been commonly cultivated outside its native range, and has naturalized from plantings in China and North America.

Deutzia crenata is a deciduous shrub. Its leaves are opposite, dentate, and rather thickened. In contrast to the similar Deutzia scabra, its leaves are not notably diamorphic and are found on short petioles throughout the length of the stem. In addition, all of the filaments of Deutzia crenata are toothed. In Japan, this species produces flowers from May to July.

A form with doubled flowers (forma plena) is popular in gardens.

References

crenata